Sechseläutenplatz (literally: Sechseläuten square) is the largest town square situated in Zürich, Switzerland. Its name derives from the Sechseläuten (the city's traditional spring holiday), which is celebrated on the square in April.

Geography 
Sechseläutenplatz is located on the east shore of Lake Zurich, just south of the lake's outflow to the river Limmat and the Schanzengraben moat. The plaza is bounded to the south by the linked Opernhaus and Bernhardtheater buildings; to the west by the Utoquai lakeside promenade; and to the east by Theaterstrasse, across which is Stadelhoferplatz, with the Stadelhofen railway station and the terminus of the Forchbahn (FOB). To the north, Sechseläutenplatz merges into Bellevueplatz, where stops for the Zürich tram lines 2, 4, 5, 8, 9, 11 and 15 are located.

On November 30, 2011, the government of Zürich announced that some streets would be renamed by redesigning the public area at Sechseläutenplatz. Theaterplatz will be part of the Sechseläutenplatz area, and Gottfried-Keller-Strasse and Goethestrasse partially repealed. Residents have been informed that these will be addressed as Sechseläutenplatz 1 to 10.

History

Prehistory 

The area has been internationally known since 2009, when digging for an underground parking facility uncovered the remains of prehistoric pile dwellings. Remains were found in the immediate vicinity of this wetland soil settlement, Kleiner Hafner, in the lower basin of Lake Zürich. The construction works were suspended for nine months and the settlement remains were systematically archaeologically recorded. The results of the excavations are permanently displayed in a pavilion next to the lakeshore.

Located on what was then swampland between the river Limmat and Lake Zürich, around present-day Sechseläutzenplatz–Bürkliplatz, the prehistoric dwellings were set on piles to protect against occasional flooding by the rivers Linth and Jona. The Neolithic settlement Zürich–Enge Alpenquai is located at the Bürkliplatz in Enge, a locality of the municipality of Zürich. It was neighbored by the settlements at Kleiner Hafner (a former island/peninsula at Sechseläutenplatz) and Grosser Hafner island (which was also part of the Celtic and Gallo-Roman settlement area) in the effluence of the Limmat, within an area of about 0.2 square kilometres (50 acres) in the heart of the city of Zürich. 

Kleiner Hafner and Grosser Hafner are very rare sites, representing all periods of pile dwelling. There are finds from the Neolithic Egolzwil, Cortaillod and Horgen cultures, forming an important reference which allows study of the cultural development during the late 5th and early 4th millennia BC. They and other prehistoric settlements in the lower Lake Zürich area are part of Prehistoric Pile dwellings around the Alps, an UNESCO World Heritage Site, recognized as one of 111 world locations with the greatest scientific potential.

Since the Middle Ages 
In the late European Middle Ages, the Sechseläutenplatz area was the location of the former military harbour of the city of Zürich, part of the Stadelhoferbollwerk bastion on the Lake Zürich shore. The former Stadelhofer bulwark was built as part of the fourth city fortifications in 1643 AD, its bastion built partly into the lake. In 1673, the Stadelhofen ravelin was attached. These fortifications, which had become obsolete, were completely demolished in 1837–38.

The restaurant Kornhaus operated on the site from 1839 to 1860.  In 1867, the building was taken over as a temporary facility of the Tonhalle orchestra, and demolished sometime after. First mentioned in 1896 as Sechseläutenplatz,  from the 1910s to 2008 the place was a meadow commonly known as Sechseläutenwiese. Since 1902, it was used for the spring Sechseläuten celebration and other events, including shows by Circus Knie. It also became the home of the Opernhaus Zürich and of the Grand Café Esplanade built by J. Pfister Picault in 1925. On 19 December 1941, the Bernhard-Theater Zürich opened as an entertainment theater for plays, farces and comedies in the Swiss-German language. To ensure the food supply of the city population in wartime, potatoes were planted in the meadow in November 1940. In May 1981, the Esplanade building was demolished and the present Bernhard-Theater was re-opened on 27–28 December 1984 after three years of transition. In the nearby Schanzengraben, the Old Botanical Garden is located. The area towards the Opernhaus-Bernhardtheater was used as a parking facility from the 1960s until 2008.

Redesign 
Due to a referendum, the construction work was delayed a year from its planned commencement. In January 2013, the main work began and about a year later the redesigned Sechseläutenplatz was inaugurated. The cost for the city of Zürich amounted to 17.2 million Swiss Francs, of which CHF 10,250,000 were used on the renewal, road drainage and superstructure of the neighboring roads. The costs for the square's design and construction works totalled to around CHF 28 million, of which 11 million was paid by the canton of Zürich. The loss of a car lane on the Utoquai roadway caused a bitter dispute between the city and the canton of Zürich, with the district court deciding in favour of the city. The planning works were done by Zach + Zünd Architekten, Vetsch Nipkow Landschaftsarchitekten, Heyer Kaufmann Bauingenieure.

Architecture 
Surface parking was replaced by an underground parking facility, for the Opéra and the Münsterhof square, and the public square was expanded towards the Opera House. The aim of the city government was to "upgrade for pedestrians in Zürich at a central location, to create a place with international appeal". The material was "thoroughly tested over a long period", with respect to cleaning, slip resistance or behavior during prolonged heat. To exclude damage on burning of the Böögg (a winter effigy burned during Sechseläuten), a shell of firebrick was installed. Additionally, the impact of elephant dung on the Vals quartzite was tested and anchorages for the Knie's circus tent firmly integrated in the surface structure. The last stones were laid on 19 November 2013, three weeks earlier than planned. In February and March 2014, 56 seven-year-old red oaks and tulip trees were planted. These varieties were particularly suitable for the inner-city location.

Infrastructure and fountain 

Rooms under the square, below the groundwater level, provide the hidden infrastructure for lighting, electrical power distribution, and the pumps and control systems for the fountains. Each nozzle has a white LED light that can illuminate the water from below at night. Drainage systems receive the fountain water though a series of chambers which collect detritus, filter the water, and process it with chlorine and glass water; the purified water is then returned to the pumps to be reused. In all, 1.5 million Swiss Francs were paid for the design.

Activities and sights 

According to the government's concept, Sechseläutenplatz may be used for events 180 days per year. Among them are Circus Knie, Sechseläuten and the Zürich Film Festival. In the summer months, the square must have full public access for at least 120 days to fulfill its function as the main inner-city space, so summertime events are limited to the area of the former Sechseläutenwiese. The former Theaterplatz square in front of the Opera House serves as the connection between Stadelhoferplatz and the Lake Zürich lakeshore. The city's authorities declared the area between Stadelhofen station and Sechseläutenplatz as a car-free zone. Wienachtsmärt, a Christmas fair, is a new event first held in 2015, opened on 19 November by Zürich's mayor, Corine Mauch. It had about 100 huts presenting modern design products and traditional handicrafts.

Parking Opéra 
Opened in May 2012, the underground parking garage houses two parking levels for 299 cars. The parking facility is operated by the Opéra AG, a consortium of the companies Hardturmstrasse AG and AMAG. Up to 50 parking spaces are reserved for long-term tenants. The entrance is situated at Falkenstrasse/Schillerstrasse. On Sechseläutenplatz, pedestrian access to the facility is provided by two pavilions, one of which houses a boulevard café. The second pavilion has a display presenting an overview of the archaeological findings from the excavation (Archäologie im Parkhaus Opera).

Cultural heritage and protection 
As part of the 56 Swiss sites of the UNESCO World Heritage Site Prehistoric pile dwellings around the Alps, the Neolithic, Celtic and Gallo-Roman settlements are also listed in the Swiss inventory of cultural property of national and regional significance as Class objects. Hence, the area is provided as a historical site under federal protection, within the meaning of the Swiss Federal Act on natural and cultural heritage (German: Bundesgesetz über den Natur- und Heimatschutz NHG) of 1 July 1966. Unauthorised researching and purposeful gathering of findings represent a criminal offense according to  24.

Literature 
 Margrit Balmer: "Zürich in der Spätlatène- und frühen Kaiserzeit. Vom keltischen Oppidum zum römischen Vicus Turicum." In: Monographien der Kantonsarchäologie Zürich 39, Hochbaudepartement/Amt für Städtebau/Stadtarchäologie (Hrsg.), Fotorotar-Verlag, Zürich und Egg 2009, .
 Dölf Wild et al.: Stadtmauern. Ein neues Bild der Stadtbefestigung Zürich. Schrift zur Ausstellung im Haus zum Rech, Zürich 6. Februar bis 30. April 2004. In: Stadtgeschichte und Städtebau in Zürich. Schriften zur Archäologie, Denkmalpflege und Stadtplanung. Volume 5. Werd-Verlag, Zürich 2004, .

See also 
 Prehistoric pile dwellings around Lake Zurich
 Bellevueplatz

References

External links 

History of Zürich
Altstadt (Zürich)
Squares in Zürich
Archaeological sites in Switzerland
Parking facilities
Museums in Zürich